Livundoni is a settlement in Kenya's Kwale County.

Populated places in Coast Province
Kwale County